Albert Perera (died 1965) was a Sri Lankan boxer who mainly competed in the bantamweight category.

Career
He represented Ceylon at the 1948 Summer Olympics, the year Ceylon got independence  from the British Empire. It was also the first Olympics where Ceylon was eligible to participate and Albert competed in the men's bantamweight event. Albert Perera also represented Ceylon at the 1950 British Empire Games and clinched a silver medal in the men's bantamweight category.

References

External links
 

Year of birth missing
Date of birth missing
1965 deaths
Sri Lankan male boxers
Boxers at the 1948 Summer Olympics
Olympic boxers of Sri Lanka
Boxers at the 1950 British Empire Games
Commonwealth Games medallists in boxing
Commonwealth Games silver medallists for Sri Lanka
Bantamweight boxers
Medallists at the 1950 British Empire Games